Peninsula Symphony Orchestra may refer to:

Peninsula Symphony American symphony orchestra based in the San Francisco Peninsula
Peninsula Symphony Orchestra, merged in 1979 to form the Virginia Symphony Orchestra